Joseph Lagu (born 26 November 1929 in a hamlet called Momokwe in Moli, northern region of Madiland, about 80 miles south of Juba, Sudan, currently South Sudan) is a South Sudanese military figure and politician. He belongs to the Madi ethnic group of Eastern Equatoria State, South Sudan.

In May 1960 he graduated from the military college in Omdurman and was commissioned as a second lieutenant in the Sudanese Army and was posted to Shendi with the 10th Brigade, Northern Command.

In the period 1978–1979, Lagu served as the second President of the High Executive Council of the autonomous region of Southern Sudan.

Civil War
On the 4th June 1963 he defected from the Army and joined the South Sudan resistance movement against the Government of Sudan.  In September 1963, he founded Anya nya the military wing of the resistance movement, named after a deadly poison. Anya-nya reinvigorated the movement that erupted on 18 August 1955 and continued the fight against the Sudanese government in the First Sudanese Civil War, which after the mutiny of 1955, really actively began in 1963. Among Joseph Lagu's junior officers in Anya-nya was John Garang who was recruited in October 1970 and was later to become the chief architect of the second civil war.

During the civil war, Lago established contact with Israel, successfully appealing for support by portraying the war as one between non-Arabs and Pan-Arabists, marking the beginning of Israel-South Sudanese relations.

Peace process
The war ended in 1972, after a peace agreement was signed in Addis Ababa by the Sudanese government led by President Gaafar Nimeiry and the South Sudan Liberation Movement (SSLM), political wing of the resistance founded by Joseph Lagu when he took overall control of the entire southern resistance in January 1971. The agreement was signed under the auspices of emperor Haile Selassie. The Addis Ababa Agreement granted regional autonomy to Southern Sudan and ensured that Anya-nya and its political arms would be absorbed into the national army, police force and the newly formed national government. Joseph Lagu, who rejoined the Sudanese armed forces with the rank of Major General, stayed on in the Army to ensure a smooth merger of the disparate forces. The ten years following the agreement gave the country the longest period of relative peace in Sudan's turbulent history, plagued as it was by coup d'etats and civil wars. It also gave Southern Sudan a chance at developing democratic institutions in its own autonomous context.

Public life
After leaving military service he entered political life. He was elected by popular vote to the Presidency of the High Executive Council of the Southern Sudan Autonomous Region in 1978 and in 1982 was appointed 2nd Vice President of the Republic.

In 1985 when Nimeiry's government was toppled by his defence minister, Gen. Mohammed Ahmed Suar-El-Dahab, Joseph Lagu also lost his position as 2nd Vice President. Relocating to the UK with his family, Joseph Lagu kept quite a low political profile, though he sometimes appeared on political rallies. The brief military rule that succeeded the coup was followed by a democratically elected government under the Premiership of Sadiq al-Mahdi. Joseph Lagu was appointed Roving Ambassador by the elected Prime Minister Sadiq al-Mahdi. Al Mahdi's government was in turn overthrown by Gen. Omar al-Bashir (then a Brigadier) who has managed to maintain his hold on power since the coup in 1989. Joseph Lagu's post as Roving Ambassador continued under the new regime having been confirmed by President al-Bashir himself. Joseph Lagu was appointed as Sudanese Ambassador to the UN between September 1990 and January 1992. He was then reappointed Roving Ambassador. He resigned from the position in May 1998 after he was appointment as Presidential Advisor, a post that he declined requesting he be relieved of all official duty so as to become a private citizen and an independent voice.

In 2006 he completed writing his memoirs—Sudan Odyssey Through a State from Ruin to Hope.

References 

Vice presidents of Sudan
1929 births
Living people
Presidents of South Sudan
Sudanese rebels
People from Central Equatoria
Sudan People's Liberation Movement politicians
Permanent Representatives of Sudan to the United Nations